Wizards' Realm is a role-playing game published by Mystic Swamp in 1981.

Description
Wizards' Realm is a fantasy system with a simplified, back-to-basics approach. Character creation employs a class-and-level system; classes include wizards, spellcasters, knights, and anti-paladins. The combat system is quite simple. The book includes maps, a sample town, an errata, and an introductory scenario.

Publication history
Wizards' Realm was designed by Cheryl W. Duval, Neils Erickson, Clifford Polite, and William G. Murphy, and published by Mystic Swamp in 1981 as a 64-page book with a map. The ring binder edition was published in 1983.

Reception
Ronald Pehr reviewed Wizard's Realm in The Space Gamer No. 53. Pehr commented that "Wizard's Realm can provide FRPG adventures in a satisfactory manner, but is not so fascinating, original, and detailed that people will abandon other games to come flocking.  However, the price is right and someone shopping for a present for a neophyte FRPG devotee-to-be could do a whole lot worse."

Lester W. Smith reviewed Wizard's Realm, Ringbinder Edition in The Space Gamer No. 75. Smith commented that "I recommend the Wizard's Realm Ringbinder Edition for anyone interested in fantasy roleplaying. It contains everything needed for a campaign, and is worth considerably more than its price".

Reviews
Different Worlds (Issue 26 - Jan 1983)
Nexus (Issue 2 - Jun 1982)

References

Fantasy role-playing games
Role-playing games introduced in 1981